Mortsel-Deurnesteenweg is a railway station in Mortsel, just south of the city of Antwerp, Antwerp, Belgium. The station opened in 1933 on the Line 25. The station Mortsel is located just 100m east of this station on the line towards Lier. The station is currently only served at weekends and is closed during the week.

Train services
The station is served by the following services:

Brussels RER services (S1) Antwerp - Mechelen - Brussels (weekends)

Bus services
Bus services 33, 51, 52 and 53 serve the station, these are operated by De Lijn.

External links
belgianrail.be
De Lijn website

Railway stations opened in 1933
Railway stations in Belgium
Railway stations in Antwerp Province
Mortsel